Hnat is a Ukrainian personal name, an equivalent of Ignatius. It may refer to the following people:
 Surname:
 Felix Hnat (b. 1982), Austrian animal rights activist
 Virgil Hnat (1936—2001), Romanian handball player and coach
 Zdeněk Hnát (b. 1935), Czech classical pianist
 Given name:
 Hnat Domenichelli (b. 1976), Canadian-Swiss ice hockey player
 Hnat Honcharenko (1853—c. 1917), Ukrainian kobzar
 Hnat Khotkevych (1877—1938), Ukrainian writer, ethnographer and composer
 Hnat Stefaniv (1895—1949), Ukrainian colonel of the Ukrainian Galician Army

See also
 

Surnames
Given names